The Wolf Cemetery is a historic cemetery in rural Baxter County, Arkansas. It is located near the end of County Road 68, just south of its crossing of railroad tracks and north of the White River. The cemetery was established c. 1820, and contains the remains of a number of Baxter County's earliest settlers from the Adams and Wolf families. There are 25 marked and about 75 unmarked graves, with the oldest marked grave dating to 1823. Its most recent burial was in the early 20th century.

The cemetery was listed on the National Register of Historic Places in 2013.

See also
 Jacob Wolf House
 National Register of Historic Places listings in Baxter County, Arkansas

References

Cemeteries on the National Register of Historic Places in Arkansas
Buildings and structures completed in 1820
National Register of Historic Places in Baxter County, Arkansas
1820 establishments in Arkansas Territory
Cemeteries established in the 1820s